Giuntini Project IV is the  fourth album from Italian guitarist Aldo Giuntini's solo band and the third to feature former Black Sabbath singer Tony Martin on vocals.  Swedish rock singer Liz Vandall performs guest vocals on the track 'Bring on the Night'. It was released on 24 May 2013 and, like the previous album, is produced by Dario Mollo. As Tony Martin told to an interview: "...the Giuntini music is only possible with Dario Mollo producing".

Track listing

Personnel
Band Members
Aldo Giuntini – guitar
Tony Martin – vocals
Fulvio Gaslini – bass
Fabbiano Rizzi – drums
Roberto Gualdi – drums
Liz Vandall – vocals on 'Bring on the Night'

References

Tony Martin (British singer) albums
2013 albums